The Government of Moldova is the government of the Republic of Moldova. It is housed on the Government House at the Great National Assembly Square in Chișinău, the capital of Moldova. Currently, the President of Moldova is Maia Sandu, while the Prime Minister of Moldova is Dorin Recean. The current ruling cabinet of Moldova is the cabinet of Dorin Recean, incumbent since 16 February 2023.

See also
 Politics of Moldova
 Cabinet of Moldova

References

External links
 

 
Politics of Romania
Moldova